Jermaine Lewis Ross (born April 27, 1971, in Jeffersonville, Indiana) is an American football player. A graduate of Jeffersonville High School, he  attended Purdue University before going into the National Football League.

Football career
Jermaine entered the NFL in 1994 with the Los Angeles Rams before the team moved to St. Louis in 1995. After the 1998 season with the Jaguars he became inactive as a football player after five seasons in the NFL.

External links
NFL.com
SI.com

References

1971 births
Living people
American football wide receivers
Jacksonville Jaguars players
People from Jeffersonville, Indiana
St. Louis Rams players
Purdue Boilermakers football players